In enzymology, a NADH kinase is an enzyme that catalyzes a chemical reaction.

Explanation 
ATP + NADH  ADP + NADPH

Thus, the two substrates of this enzyme are ATP and NADH, whereas its two products are ADP and NADPH.

This enzyme belongs to the family of transferases, specifically those transferring phosphorus-containing groups (phosphotransferases) with an alcohol group as acceptor.  The systematic name of this enzyme class is ATP:NADH 2'-phosphotransferase. Other names in common use include reduced nicotinamide adenine dinucleotide kinase (phosphorylating), DPNH kinase, reduced diphosphopyridine nucleotide kinase, and NADH kinase.  This enzyme has at least one activator, acetate.

References

 

EC 2.7.1
NADPH-dependent enzymes
Enzymes of unknown structure